Gallt Llanerch - Coed Gelli-deg is a Site of Special Scientific Interest (or SSSI) in the Gwaun Valley, Pembrokeshire, South Wales. It has been designated as a Site of Special Scientific Interest since January 1954 in an attempt to protect its fragile biological elements. The site has an area of 30.47 hectares and is managed by Natural Resources Wales.

Type and features
This site is designated due to its biological qualities. SSSIs in Wales have been notified for a total of 142 different animal species and 191 different plant species.

The site has 2 special features:
 Broadleaved woodland
 Lichens typical of ancient woodlands

The site is unusual in that it escaped clear-felling during the two World Wars and some oak trees have survived. Species not native to Pembrokeshire have been planted in the past, including beech and sycamore trees which will gradually be removed from the wood as both species create dense shade, making conditions unfavourable for many lichens.

See also
List of Sites of Special Scientific Interest in Pembrokeshire

References

External links
Natural Resources Wales website

Sites of Special Scientific Interest in Pembrokeshire